is a katsudō-benshi, voice actor, an actress, a choreographer, and a tarento born January 15, 1978, in Sendai, Miyagi Prefecture, Japan and raised in Ōta, Tokyo.

References

1978 births
Japanese television actresses
Living people
Voice actresses from Sendai
Japanese voice actresses
Japanese choreographers
21st-century Japanese actresses